Gelu may refer to:

People 
 Gelou, 10th-century leader of the Vlachs and Slavs in Transylvania
 Gelu Barbu (1932–2016), Romanian-born Spanish ballet dancer and choreographer
 Gelu Lisac (born 1967), Romanian water polo player
 Gelu Radu (born 1957), Romanian weightlifter
 Gelu Velici (born 1992), Romanian footballer
 Gelu Vlașin (born 1966), Romanian poet
 Jacques Gelu, Archbishop of Embrun
 Lakpa Gelu (born 1967), Nepalese Sherpa climber

Places

Iran 
 Gelu, Qaleh Ganj, a village in Kerman Province
 Gelu, Rudbar-e Jonubi, a village in Kerman Province

Nepal 
 Gelu, Nepal

Romania 
 Gelu, Satu Mare
 Gelu, a village in Terebești Commune, Satu Mare County
 Gelu, a village in Variaș Commune, Timiș County

Other uses 
 Karluks, a Turkic tribal confederacy
 Gelu, a fictional character introduced in Heroes of Might and Magic III: Armageddon's Blade
 GELU (Gaussian Error Linear Unit), a type of activation function used in artificial neural networks

Romanian masculine given names